Keyishian v. Board of Regents, 385 U.S. 589 (1967), was a United States Supreme Court case in which the Court held that states cannot prohibit employees from being members of the Communist Party and that this law was overbroad and too vague.

Background 
New York State had laws that prohibited state employees from belonging to any organization that advocated the overthrow of the US government or was "treasonous" or "seditious." The regents of the State University of New York also required teachers and employees to sign an oath that they were not members of the Communist Party.

Some faculty and staff of the University were terminated for refusing to sign the oath and appealed to the Supreme Court.

Decision 
The Supreme Court, in a 5–4 decision, overturned the New York state laws prohibiting membership in seditious groups because it was too vague and was overbroad. That largely reversed the 1952 decision in Adler v. Board of Education, in which Irving Adler had been dismissed for the New York City public school system because of a previous connection with the Communist Party USA.

See also 
 List of United States Supreme Court cases involving the First Amendment
 List of United States Supreme Court cases, volume 385

References

External links 
 
 
 Heins, Marjorie. (2012, January 23). "The Keyishian Ruling: 45 Years Later," Academe Blog
 Wilson, John K. (2012, January 23). "Interview with Harry Keyishian," Academe Blog

1967 in United States case law
American Civil Liberties Union litigation
United States Free Speech Clause case law
United States Supreme Court cases
State University of New York
Anti-communism in the United States
Communist Party USA litigation
United States lawsuits
United States Supreme Court cases of the Warren Court
United States education case law
Higher education case law